Mošenik is a settlement northeast of Moravče in central Slovenia. The area is part of the traditional region of Upper Carniola. It is now included with the rest of the Municipality of Moravče in the Central Slovenia Statistical Region.

Name
Mošenik was attested in historical sources as Moschznik in 1335, Moschtzenik in 1347, Moͤschnik in 1349, and Mosschanichk in 1392, among other spellings.

References

External links

Mošenik on Geopedia

Populated places in the Municipality of Moravče